Silenced may refer to:

Films
 Silenced, a 2014 documentary by James Spione about three whistleblowers and the war on terror
 Silenced (film), a 2011 South Korean drama film

Literature
 Silenced: China's Great Wall of Censorship, a 2006 book by Oystein Alme and Morten Vågen

Music
 Silenced (album), a 2005 album by The Black Dog
 "Silenced", a song by Mudvayne from The End of All Things to Come

See also
 Silence (disambiguation)
 Silent (disambiguation)